Lütschental railway station is a railway station in the village and municipality of Lutschental in the Swiss canton of Bern. The station is on the Berner Oberland Bahn, whose trains operate services to Interlaken Ost and Grindelwald.

Services 
 the following rail services stop at Lütschental:

References

External links 
 
 

Railway stations in the canton of Bern
Bernese Oberland Railway stations
Railway stations in Switzerland opened in 1890